Charles Lee Downey (May 31, 1915 – August 21, 1990) was an American politician. He succeeded his father, Simon, in the Maryland House of Delegates, and, shortly after winning election to a second term, he was appointed by Governor Theodore McKeldin to fill a vacancy in the state senate. He later served on the Washington County commission.

References 

1915 births
1990 deaths
Republican Party Maryland state senators
Republican Party members of the Maryland House of Delegates
20th-century American politicians